Malouin was a schooner commissioned as a privateer in Saint-Malo in June 1803 under Captain Loriot (or L'Orient). She was captured in July 1803.

In July 1803 Lloyd's List reported that the frigate  had captured Demerara Packet, but that the French privateer Malouin had re-captured her. Then  re-captured Demerara Packet. 

Malouin had also captured Little Jane, which had been sailing from Jamaica to London and sent Little Jane into Passage.

Lloyd's List reported on 12 July 1803, that a French privateer had captured , Griegg, master, as she was sailing from Jamaica to London. However, the British privateers Lord Nelson and Trimmer had retaken her and sent her into Plymouth. The French privateer Malwan or Malouin, of four guns, out from Saint-Malo 15 days, had captured Princess of Wales on 2 July. The two British privateers recaptured her on 6 July. Princess of Wales was carrying a valuable cargo of 580 hogsheads of sugar and 150 logs. Princess of Wales had only two guns, and the French prize master had only 10 men to man them and sail her, but he fought for eight hours before striking. Captain Gregg was surprised to discover Princess of Wales in the Catwater; he had assumed that her captor had taken her to France. He had been a prisoner on Malouin, and had come into Plymouth on 16 July when the privateer brig Speedwell had captured Malouin a few days earlier and brought her into Plymouth.

Notes, citations, and references
Notes

Citations

References
 
 

1800s ships
Privateer ships of France
Captured ships